Senad Karahmet (born 25 February 1992) is a Bosnian-Herzegovinian footballer who plays as left back for Belgian amateur club City Pirates.

Club career
Karahmet made his debut in Jupiler Pro League on 28 April 2012 in the home play-off match against K. Lierse SK, KV Mechelen won this game with 4–3. He was in the starting line-up of his team since Antonio Ghomsi was suspended. He joined Belgian 4th tier side City Pirates in summer 2020.

References

External links
 
 

1992 births
Living people
People from Doboj
Association football defenders
Bosnia and Herzegovina footballers
Belgian footballers
K.V. Mechelen players
Ruch Chorzów players
FK Mladost Doboj Kakanj players
NK Čelik Zenica players
Royal Cappellen F.C. players
K.S.K. Heist players
Belgian Pro League players
Premier League of Bosnia and Herzegovina players
Belgian Third Division players
Bosnia and Herzegovina expatriate footballers
Expatriate footballers in Belgium
Bosnia and Herzegovina expatriate sportspeople in Belgium
Expatriate footballers in Poland
Bosnia and Herzegovina expatriate sportspeople in Poland